Carlos Tobalina Aspirez (born 2 August 1985 in Barakaldo) is a Spanish athlete specialising in the shot put. He represented his country at the 2016 World Indoor Championships finishing tenth.

His personal bests in the event are 20.32 metres outdoors (Leiria 2014) and 20.50 metres indoors (Madrid 2016).

Competition record

References

1985 births
Living people
Spanish male shot putters
People from Castro Urdiales
Athletes (track and field) at the 2016 Summer Olympics
Olympic athletes of Spain
Spanish Athletics Championships winners
Athletes (track and field) at the 2018 Mediterranean Games
Mediterranean Games competitors for Spain
Sportspeople from Cantabria
Sportspeople from Barakaldo